North Wall is an area east of the inner north side of Dublin, along the River Liffey where it forms one of the Dublin quays. It contains the entire north side of Dublin Docklands and includes the International Financial Services Centre, Spencer Dock, and further east the main part of Dublin Port.

The area is dominated by a combination of older housing, dockland activities and new development through the Docklands Strategic Development Zone Planning Scheme, including extensive construction of new retail, residential and office spaces.

Transport in the area includes the Dublin Area Rapid Transit (Docklands railway station on Sheriff Street), the LUAS (red line stations George's Dock, Mayor Square, Spencer Dock, and The Point, and 8 dublinbikes stations (at Custom House Quay, City Quay, Excise Walk, Lime Street, Guild Street, Convention Centre, New Central Bank, and The Point).

See also
 International Financial Services Centre
 Spencer Dock
 3Arena
 Dublin Docklands
 Docklands Strategic Development Zone

 
Dublin Docklands
Towns and villages in Dublin (city)